Priyamanaval was an Indian Tamil-language soap opera starring Praveena and Subhalekha Sudhakar. It premiered on 19 January 2015 on Sun TV and ended on 11 May 2019. It was directed by E. Vikramadithyan and produced by Vikatan Televistas.

Elizabeth Suraj Played the negative role of Eashwari until for about 800 episodes until 2017.

Plot

Uma (Praveena), a Sri Lankan refugee, and Krishna (Tamilian) marry and become rich. Their married life is happy and they have four sons. Uma and Krishna have supported by  Vaithi, Krishnan's maternal uncle's son. Vaithi disowned his parents after they tried to kill Krishna and Uma for their love, and he has been supporting Uma and Krishna since then. Another supporter is Krishna's close friend  Ayyavu, who with  Krishna starts a successful jewellery transport company with the help of Ayyavu's wife Eshwari.

Eshwari is not happy with having Krishna and Uma in partnership with the company, and throws Krishna out of the company. Uma gives Krishna her jewels and helps him start a new transport company named "UMA TRANSPORTS". Over time, Uma Transports becomes successful and the couple grows rich. At the same time, Ayyavu faces loss and goes to jail, and his family become destitute. When Krishna learns of what has happened, he helps Ayyavu and offers him a job, working at Uma Transports. He is highly loyal to Krishna.

After 30 years of marriage, Uma and Krishnan have a happy family, with their four grown-up sons - Natraj Krishnan, Saravanan Krishnan, Dileepan Krishnan and Prabhakaran Krishnan. Krishna is now a local VIP and the couple are known for their generosity to the needy. Everyone respects them because of their impartiality towards the poor and rich. Uma desires to lead a happy life with her four sons, their wives, and her grandchildren.

Ayyavu, his brother ACP Rathnam and his daughter Sumathi are loyal and have a good friendship with Uma's family but Eshwari and their son Kannan are jealous of their wealth. Kannan plans to destroy their family and steal their assets. He is joined by Krishna's maternal uncle and his family who also seek revenge from them.

In the meantime, Natraj marries Avanthika, Saravanan marries Bhoomika, Dileepan Marries Kavitha and Prabha Marries  Isaipriya. Just as they start to lead a happy married life, many challenges come across in life due to the torture given by Krishnan's uncle Vinayagm, his daughter Geetha, her husband Giridharan, Giri's brother Dharma etc. The family loses Kavitha who is killed by Dharma thus forcing Dileep to a remarriage with another of his maternal uncle's daughter Swathi.
However, without losing hope, they win in their life.

Main Cast
 Subhalekha Sudhakar as Krishnan 
 Vijay as Natraj Krishnan alias Natraj
 Sivaranjini Vijay as Avanthika Natraj, Natraj 's Wife, Bhoomika 's sister,Rajaram and Malliga 's elder daughter)
 Dharish Jeyaseelan as Saravanan Krishnan alias Saravanan  (Uma and Krishnan Second son)
Kiran Mai as Bhoomika Saravanan, Saravanan 's Wife, Avanthika 's sister, (Rajaram and Malliga 's Younger daughter)
 Vineeth Sundaram as Dileepan Krishnan alias Dileepa   (Uma and Krishnan third son)
 Niranjani Ashok / Navya narayanan as Kavitha Dileepan: Dileepan 's first Wife, Killed by Dharma (Dead)
 Abinavya as Swathi Dileepan: Dileepan 's 2nd Wife, Selvi and Revathi 's sister,Kutti Mani and Radha 's Second daughter)
 Mohammed Azeem/ Karthick Vasudevan as Prabhakaran Krishnan alias Prabha (Prabhakar)(Uma and Krishnan Youngest son)
 Preethi Kumar as Nandhini Prabhakaran : Prabhakaran’s ex - Wife, Rudra 's daughter, Vinayagam 's niece) (Dead)
 Haripriya as Isaipriya Prabhakaran : Prabhakaran’s second wife , Uma and Krishnan 's younger daughter)
Praveena as Umayaal Uma Krishnan * as young Uma (Natrajan,Dileepan, Saravanan and  Prabhakaran Mother)
 Hemanth Kumar as Kumar (Selvi's husband, Swarnam's stepson)
 Bhavana Mahadevappa as Tamilselvi "selvi" Kumar (Kumar's wife, Kutti Mani and Radha's elder daughter, Swathi and Revathi's sister)

Additional Cast
 V. Dasarathy as Kutti Mani  (Uma and Muthukumar's eldest brother, Radha's husband, Selvi, Swathi and Revathi's father)
 Seema as  Revathi  (Swathi and Selvi's sister, Kuttimani and Radha's younger daughter)
 Chandini Prakash as  Sasirekha Sasi IPS (Vinayagam daughter, Dileepan's ex-girlfriend)
 Venkat Subha as Vinayagam (Krishnan's brother-in-law, Geetha, Vaitheeswaran and Sasirekha's father) (died in serial)
 Ganesh / Ramnath as Rudramoorthy  (Vinayagam's brother, Ram and Nandhini's father)
 Padmini / Agalya as Ulaganaayagi Vinayagam (Vinayagam's wife, Geetha and Vaitheeswaran's mother)
 Meenakshi as Jaya Vinayagam (Vinayagam's 2nd wife, Sasirekha's mother)
 Rajesh as Muthukumar alias Muthu (Isaipriya, Kathir and Isaikuyil's father, Uma and Kutti Mani's brother)
 Abishek Rathan as  Kathirkaaman "Kathir" Muthu Kumar (Isaipriya and Isaikuyil's brother, Muthukumar's second son)
 Ultra Shree as  Isaikuyil "kuyil" Muthu Kumar (Isai and Kathir's sister, Muthukumar's Younger daughter)
 Pandiyaraj (Parthian Siva) as DCP  Giridharan  & Dharmalingam (Geetha's husband, Vinayagam 's son -in - law) (Giridharan and Dharmalingam 's brother died in serial)
 Gowthami Vembunathan as Swarnam (Kumar's stepmother, Karpooram, Gowtham and Malar's mother)
 Shree Narayanan as Karpooram (Kumar stepbrother, Gowtham and Malar's elder brother, Swarnam's eldest son)
 B.Jayalakshmi as Thilaga Karpooram (Karpooram's wife, Priya's sister)
 Ameen Fakkir as Gowtham (Kumar's stepbrother, Karpooram and Malar's brother, Swarnam's second son)
 Keerthi Vijay as Malar (Kumar's stepsister, Karpooram and Gowtham's younger sister, Swarnam's daughter)
 Vanitha Hariharan as Priya (Thilaga's sister)
 Giri as Vaidyanathan "Vaithi" Vinayagam * as young Vaithi (Geetha's brother, Vinayagam's son)  
 Nilani as Susila Vaithi (Vaithi's wife)
 Krishna Kumar as ACP Rathnam (Ayyavu's brother)
 Caroline Hiltrud as Themmozhi Rathnam (Rathnam's wife)
 VJ Sam as Kalaiselvan alias kalai (Prabhakaran's friend)
 Rathnakumar as Sermadurai (Giri's ally)
 Sandhanalakshmi / Premalatha   as  Geetha Vinayagam Giridharan * as young Geetha (Giri's wife, Vinayagam and Ulaganayagi's daughter) (died in serial)
 Harish G as  Ramanathan Rudramoorthy  (Rudramoorthy's son, Vinayagam's nephew, Nandhini's brother)
 Narayanamurthy Deivanayagam as Subramaniam alias Subbu (Krishnan's office staff)
 Egavalli as Sevandhi (Dharma's ally) (died in serial) 
 Mahesh as Nirmal (Bhoomika's childhood friend)
 Usha Elizabeth Suraj /Babitha as Eshwari Iyyavu (Iyyavu's wife, Sumathi and Kannan's mother)
 Harish Adithya as  Kannan Iyyavu * as young Kannan (Iyyavu and Eashwari's son, Sumathi's brother) (died in serial)
 K. Veera as Ayyavu * as young Ayyavu (Krishnan's best friend, Eashwari's husband, Kannan and Sumathi's father) (died in serial)
 Uma Padmanabhan as Radha Mani (Kutti Mani's wife, Selvi, Swathi and Revathi's mother) (died in serial)
 Vishwanth as Jambulingeshwaran Jambu Manickavaasagam (Sumathi's husband, Ayyavu and Eashwari's son-in-law)
 Subbulakshmi as  Sumathi Jambulingeshwaran * as young Sumathi (Ayyavu and Eashwari's daughter, Jambu's wife, Kannan's sister)
 Bala subramani / Ramki as Rajaram (Avanthika and Bhoomika's father, Malliga's husband)
 Balambiga as Malliga Rajaram (Rajaram's wife, Avanthika and Bhoomika's mother)

References

External links 
 Official Website 

Tamil-language television shows
Tamil-language romance television series
2015 Tamil-language television series debuts
Sun TV original programming
2010s Tamil-language television series